Archer City is a city in and the county seat of Archer County, Texas, United States. The city lies at the junction of State Highway 79 and State Highway 25. It is located 25 miles (40 km) south of Wichita Falls, and is part of the Wichita Falls metropolitan statistical area. Its population was 1,834 at the 2010 census.

The city is named for Branch Tanner Archer, a commissioner for the Republic of Texas.

Geography

Archer City is located at  (33.594036, –98.626499).

Demographics

2020 census

As of the 2020 United States census, there were 1,601 people, 717 households, and 340 families residing in the city.

2010 census
As of the census of 2010,  1,834 people, 758 households, and 506 families were residing in the city. The population density was 837.3 people/sq mi (322.9/km2). The 869 housing units  averaged 393.7/sq mi (151.8/km2). The racial makeup of the city was 97.56% White, 0.70% Native American, 0.81% from other races, and 0.92% from two or more races. Hispanic or Latino of any race were 2.33% of the population.

Of the 758 households,  33.5% had children under 18 living with them, 56.2% were married couples living together, 8.4% had a female householder with no husband present, and 33.2% were not families. About 30.5% of all households were made up of individuals, and 14.6% had someone living alone who was 65 or older. The average household size was 2.38,and the average family size was 2.99.

In the city, the age distribution was 25.6% under 18, 7.5% from 18 to 24, 25.9% from 25 to 44, 22.5% from 45 to 64, and 18.5% who were 65  or older. The median age was 39 years. For every 100 females, there were 88.6 males. For every 100 females age 18 and over, there were 83.1 males.

The median income for a household in the city was $29,886, and for a family was $36,563. Males had a median income of $29,524 versus $18,977 for females. The per capita income for the city was $19,140. About 11.3% of families and 13.5% of the population were below the poverty line, including 13.8% of those under age 18 and 17.9% of those age 65 or over.

Government and infrastructure
Kelvin Green was elected mayor of Archer City in 2014 at the age of 18. He ran unopposed and was in high school. He was re-elected in 2017.

Eight miles (12.8 km) west-southwest of the city lies a 2-mile (3.2 km) antenna, the Lake Kickapoo Field Station, operated by the 20th Space Control Squadron, and part of the Air Force Space Surveillance System, used for observing objects passing over the United States. It is the primary anchor transmitter for the Space Command southern "fence" (or "Space Fence") network for monitoring the space defense system. It extends east-to-west across America at about  33°N. The antenna has no public access and restricted entry.

Education

Archer City is served by the Archer City Independent School District, with one campus consisting of Archer City High School (grades 7–12) and Archer City Elementary School (grades K–6).

Notable people

 Angela Kinsey, Actress best known for portraying Angela Martin in the comedy series The Office
 Larry McMurtry, Novelist and screenwriter known for Terms of Endearment, Pulitzer Prize-winning Lonesome Dove, and The Last Picture Show, the latter of which was filmed in Archer City
 Graham B. Purcell, Jr., U.S. representative from Texas's 13th congressional district from 1962 to 1973, was born in Archer City in 1919

Climate
The climate in this area is characterized as very hot, with humid summers and generally mild to cool winters.  According to the Köppen climate classification, Archer City has a humid subtropical climate, Cfa on climate maps.

Gallery

References

External links

 Archer City
 Archer City Independent School District Official Website
 

Cities in Archer County, Texas
Cities in Texas
County seats in Texas
Wichita Falls metropolitan area